Merophyas is a genus of moths belonging to the subfamily Tortricinae of the family Tortricidae. In December 2015 it was sunk as a synonym of Clepsis Guenée, 1845.<ref>Razowski, J. 2015: Diagnoses and remarks on the genera of Tortricidae (Lepidoptera). Part 3. Archipini. Acta zoologica cracoviensia (ISSN 0065-1710 eISSN 1734-915X), 58'(2): 195-251.  [See p. 208; 'Syn. n.']</ref>

SpeciesMerophyas calculata (Meyrick, 1910)Merophyas divulsana (Walker, 1863)Merophyas immersana (Walker, 1863)Merophyas leucaniana (Walker, 1863)Merophyas paraloxa (Meyrick, 1907)Merophyas petrochroa (Lower, 1908)Merophyas scandalota (Meyrick, 1910)Merophyas siniodes (Turner, 1945)Merophyas tenuifascia (Turner, 1927)Merophyas therina (Meyrick, 1910)

See also
List of Tortricidae genera

References

 , 1964, Proc. Linn. Soc. N.S. W. 88(1963): 298.
 , 2005, World Catalogue of Insects'' 5'''.

External links
tortricidae.com

Archipini
Tortricidae genera